is the blackboard bold letter S. It can refer to:
 The sphere spectrum
 The -dimensional sphere 
 The algebra of sedenions